Edgar is an unincorporated community in Edgar County, Illinois, United States.

History
Abraham L. Stanfield (1860–1927), Illinois state representative and businessman, was born on a farm near Edgar.

Notes

Unincorporated communities in Edgar County, Illinois
Unincorporated communities in Illinois